Jhennifer Alves da Conceição (born June 13, 1997 in Nova Friburgo) is a Brazilian swimmer. Finalist at the 2022 World Championships in the 50m breaststroke.

International career

2015–16
At the 2015 South American Swimming Youth Championships, held in Lima, Peru, Conceição won two gold medals in the 100-metre breaststroke, and in the 4x50-metre medley relay.

At the 2015 Pan American Games in Toronto, Ontario, Canada, Conceição won a bronze medal in the 4 × 100 metre medley relay, along with Etiene Medeiros, Daynara de Paula and Larissa Oliveira. She also went to the 100 metre breaststroke, where she classified 5th in the heats, but was disqualified in the final.

At the 2015 World Aquatics Championships in Kazan, she finished 14th in the Women's 4 × 100 metre medley relay, 21st in the Women's 50 metre breaststroke, and 36th in the Women's 100 metre breaststroke.

2016 Summer Olympics
At the 2016 Summer Olympics, she competed in the Women's 4 × 100 metre medley relay, finishing 13th.

2017-20
On September 15, 2016, at the José Finkel Trophy (short course competition), she broke the South American record in the 50-metre breaststroke, with a time of 30.31.

On 4 May 2017, at the Maria Lenk Trophy tournament held in Rio de Janeiro, she broke the South American record in the 50-metre breaststroke, with a time of 30.63.

On 7 December 2017, at the Open tournament held in Rio de Janeiro, she broke the South American record in the 50-metre breaststroke, with a time of 30.51.

In August 2018, at the José Finkel Trophy (short course competition), she broke the South American record in the 50-metre breaststroke, with a time of 30.00, and in the 100-metre breaststroke, with a time of 1:05.69 .

In April 2019, at the 2019 Brazil Trophy, she broke two times the South American record in the 50-metre breaststroke: 30.50 at heats, and 30.47 in the final.

On 21 June 2019, at the 2019 Sette Coli in Rome, she broke the South American record in the 100-metre breaststroke, with a time of 1:07.64.

At the 2019 Pan American Games held in Lima, Peru, she won a gold medal in the Mixed 4 × 100 metre medley relay (by participating at heats), and a bronze medal in the Women's 4 × 100 metre medley relay. She also finished 5th in the Women's 100 metre breaststroke.

On 16 November 2020, at the 2020 International Swimming League, she broke the South American record in the 50-metre breaststroke (short course), with a time of 29.91.

2021-24
On 26 June 2021, at the Sette Colli Trophy , she broke the South American record in the 50-metre breaststroke, with a time of 30.40.

At the 2021 FINA World Swimming Championships (25 m) in Abu Dhabi, United Arab Emirates, she finished 9th in the Women's 50 metre breaststroke. 

At the 2022 World Aquatics Championships held in Budapest, she qualified for the Women's 50 metre breaststroke final with a time of 30.28, a new South American record.  She finished 8th in the final, being the first time that a South American woman reached the final of this event in World Championships. 

On 15 September 2022, at the José Finkel Trophy in Recife, she broke the short course South American record in the 50-metre breaststroke, with a time of 29.87.

References

Brazilian female breaststroke swimmers
1997 births
Living people
People from Nova Friburgo
Swimmers at the 2015 Pan American Games
Swimmers at the 2019 Pan American Games
Pan American Games bronze medalists for Brazil
Swimmers at the 2016 Summer Olympics
Olympic swimmers of Brazil
Pan American Games medalists in swimming
Universiade medalists in swimming
Universiade gold medalists for Brazil
Medalists at the 2015 Pan American Games
Medalists at the 2019 Pan American Games
Sportspeople from Rio de Janeiro (state)
20th-century Brazilian women
21st-century Brazilian women
South American Games gold medalists for Brazil
South American Games bronze medalists for Brazil
South American Games medalists in swimming
Competitors at the 2022 South American Games